Philip F. Walters (April 20, 1916 – February 6, 2000) was an American racing driver, who won both the 12 Hours of Sebring and Watkins Glen Grand Prix twice.

Early career

Walters was born in New York City and grew up in Manhasset, New York, and in his late teens began racing midgets at tracks on Long Island. He races under a pseudonym - "Ted Tappett" – so that his family did not know he was racing. By all accounts, Walters’s style was brute-force, all-arms-and-elbows sort of oval racer.

The War Years

It was January 1942 when he joined the United States Army Air Corps, as a transport and glider pilot. He flew a Waco CG-4A glider during a disastrous invasion of the Netherlands, which the Germans knew of in advance. He was able to safely land his troops although he was wounded, and taken prisoner. While in a German hospital, ironically, the German surgeon who saved his life by removing a kidney and half a lung had watched Walters win a midget race in Philadelphia five years before. As a result, his strength and stamina were reduced. He finished the World War II with the Air Medal, a Purple Heart, seven Bronze Stars and the rank of Flight officer.

Following those injuries sustained during the war, he adopted a smoother, less forceful driving style and found this faster, and well-suited to sports car road racing.

Racing career

Post-war career

After the war, Phil went back to racing in Kurtis-Offenhauser midgets. He resumed his winning ways, stringing together 26 feature race wins in row in 1947, and in another 47 events, he would never finish lower than third in the final results. He dominated at the Riverside Park Speedway, becoming their first track champion in 1949. Later he moved in stock cars and posted a record number of victories in USSCRC events, at places like Agawam, Deer Park, Hinchcliff and Cherry Park. In addition to his racing, he formed a business partnership with Bill Frick, called Frick-Tappett Motors, which did race car preparation and they built the well-known ‘Fordillac’ performance cars (Cadillac engines in Ford chassis). Eventually the partnership became a Volkswagen and Porsche dealership.

The Cunningham Years (1950–1955)

During 1949, Briggs Cunningham bought a Fordillac with an eye on racing it in 24 Hours of Le Mans and approached Walters with the idea of an all-American sports car for endurance racing. After a short while, Phil became the general manager of the B. S. Cunningham Company, who built the first post-war American cars to race at Le Mans. The organizers of Le Mans, Automobile Club de l'Ouest rejected the Fordillac, so Cunningham took two Cadillacs to the Circuit de la Sarthe in 1950. Walters paired with Cunningham and finished 11th in a special-bodied roadster, dubbed ‘Le Monstre’, despite Cunningham getting stuck off-course in some sand for half an hour.

Setting a shop in West Palm Beach, Florida, served as a base to the Frick-Tappett division of the B. S. Cunningham Co., the team set its sights on the 1951 Le Mans. Walters, by now Managing Director of Cunningham formed a new driver partnership with fellow American, John Fitch, ran as high as second before finishing 18th. He returned in 1952, this time alongside Duane Carter, only to record a DNF because of a blown Chrysler engine.

Though the Cunningham team did not win at Le Mans, Walters did record a third place in 1953, the car he co-drove with Fitch. They finished the race at an average speed 8 mph faster the winning Mercedes-Benz 300SL the year before, but the disc brakes in the Jaguars gave them an advantage and the Cunningham C-5R took the bottom step of the podium, before two C-Types and just ahead of another. Walters also won the 1953 12 Hours of Sebring with Fitch, against the European factory teams, in the inaugural race of the World Sportscar Championship. The Cunningham team contested the SCCA National Sports Car Championship series in the US, and here Phil won many races, including the Watkins Glen Grand Prix. Walters won three times at the Glen, including the Seneca Cup in 1950, and the Grand Prix of 1951 and 1954. During the 1952 race, he set the fastest lap, exceeding 82 mph on the original 6.6-mile course, which still stands as the official record. Following an accident during this race, the GP was moved to an interim “second course”, with a shortened 4-mile closed course. Walters was the only driver to claim Watkins Glen victories on both the original open-road course and the closed circuit.

Cunningham's idea of the all-American dream team ended with his fifth place in the 1954 24 Hours of Le Mans. This enabled Walters to race competitively with the major European marques of the era. During his time racing for Briggs Cunningham, he drove Cunningham, O.S.C.A., Porsche, Cooper, Ferrari and Jaguar sports cars, on road courses across the US and in Europe. It was in one of Cunningham’s Jaguar D-Types that he his second Sebring title, this time partnered by Englishman, Mike Hawthorn.

His ability brought him an offer from Enzo Ferrari to drive for him, in Formula One just before 1955 Le Mans. However, just before joining the Italian marque, he was the first witness the horrendous tragedy at Le Mans, in which the Mercedes-Benz 300SLR of Pierre Levegh went into the crowd and killed 85 spectators. Walters said “I had gotten used to drivers killing each other, but I could not adjust to drivers killing spectators“, and at the age of just 38, he walked away from the sport.

Away from the track

After motor racing, Walters took up sailboat racing and became an accomplished sailor. With his family as crew, he won the competitive Block Island Regatta, sailing a *Peterson 34 *(The Peterson 34 was named OBSESSION and with Phil Walters
and his crew, became known as one of the hottest racing sailboats on the Long Island Sound during the 1970s; having won a very impressive number of races during this decade - including the prestigious Block Island Race Week). In the eight years prior to his death, Phil had been a resident of Homosassa, Florida. Before that, he lived in Syosset and worked in Hicksville, where he ran a car dealership – Walters Donaldson VW-Porsche-Audi of Hicksville, New York.

Racing record

Career highlights

Complete 24 Hours of Le Mans results

Complete 12 Hours of Sebring results

Complete 12 Hours of Reims results

Complete Carrera Panamericana results

References

Racing drivers from New York City
American racing drivers
1916 births
2000 deaths
24 Hours of Le Mans drivers
12 Hours of Sebring drivers
12 Hours of Reims drivers
Carrera Panamericana drivers
World Sportscar Championship drivers
People from Citrus County, Florida